Kevin Robert Kiesel (born July 5, 1959) is an American college football coach. He was most recently the head coach for Guilford College in Greensboro, North Carolina.

Head coaching record

References

1959 births
Living people
Fairfield Stags football coaches
Fordham Rams football coaches
Gettysburg Bullets football players
Guilford Quakers football coaches
Kentucky Wildcats football coaches
Millersville Marauders football coaches
Navy Midshipmen football coaches
Temple Owls football coaches
West Chester Golden Rams football coaches
West Chester University alumni
People from Chester County, Pennsylvania
Sportspeople from Scranton, Pennsylvania
Players of American football from Pennsylvania